David George Dick (8 January 1901 – 19 June 1982) was an Australian rules footballer who played with St Kilda, Essendon and Footscray in the Victorian Football League (VFL).

Dick, a full-forward, kicked 104 goals for Hampton in 1920. The following year he joined St Kilda, where he would make a single appearance, in round 17 against Richmond.

He then returned to Hampton and remained there until 1925, when he was cleared to Essendon. In just his second game for Essendon, against Carlton at Windy Hill, Dick kicked six goals.

Dick was at a third club in 1926, Footscray, for which he played four games.

Later in the decade he played with Sandringham.

He had a brother, Fred, that played for Melbourne. Their father, Alick, was an Essendon player in the 1890s who captained the club to four premierships.

Notes

External links
 David Dick, at The VFA Project.

1901 births
1982 deaths
Australian rules footballers from Victoria (Australia)
Australian Rules footballers: place kick exponents
St Kilda Football Club players
Essendon Football Club players
Western Bulldogs players
Sandringham Football Club players